Agis (Greek: ,) was an Ancient Greek poet from Argos, and a contemporary of Alexander the Great, whom he accompanied on his Asiatic expedition.  Quintus Curtius Rufus as well as Arrian and Plutarch<ref>Plutarch, De adulat. et amic. discrim. p. 60</ref> describe him as a sycophant, one of the basest flatterers of the king.  Curtius calls him "the composer of the worst poems after Choerilus" (""), which probably refers rather to their obsequious, flattering character than to their worth as poetry.  The Greek Anthology'' contains an epigram which is probably the work of this flatterer.

Athenaeus mentions an Agis as the author of a work on the art of cooking.

References

Sources

Ancient Argives
Ancient Greek poets
4th-century BC Greek people
4th-century BC poets
Poets of Alexander the Great
Epigrammatists of the Greek Anthology